Federico "Fede" Vietto (born 1 January 1998) is an Argentine professional footballer who plays as a forward for Racing Club.

Club career
On 19 June 2017, Vietto signed his first professional contract with Racing Club. On 12 January 2020, Vietto joined on loan Patronato. Vietto made his professional debut with Patronato in a 3-3 Argentine Primera División tie with Banfield on 26 January 2020.

Personal life
Vietto is the brother of the footballer Luciano Vietto.

References

External links

1998 births
Living people
Sportspeople from Córdoba Province, Argentina
Argentine footballers
Argentina youth international footballers
Association football forwards
Argentine Primera División players
Racing Club de Avellaneda footballers
Club Atlético Patronato footballers
Club Agropecuario Argentino players
Club Atlético Temperley footballers